Life Is Wild is an American serial drama television series adapted by Michael Rauch, George Faber and Charlie Pattinson from the British drama Wild at Heart. The show is about a New York veterinarian who moves his second wife and their two sets of children to a South African game reserve run by his former father-in-law.

Produced by CBS Paramount Network Television and Company Pictures, the series was officially green-lit by The CW and given a thirteen-episode order on May 15, 2007. The series premiered on October 7, 2007, and aired every Sunday night at 8:00PM Eastern/7:00PM Central, following a repeat of Aliens in America.  In Canada on the pay TV channel E! as a mid-season replacement.  In Europe on pay TV in the  United Kingdom on the Hallmark Channel and Greece on August 1, 2011 on Skai TV. In South America on the pay TV Warner Channel.  In New Zealand weekdays during the 2009 Christmas holiday period on TV3 in a daytime slot.

The show was canceled in February 2008 due to low ratings.

Cast

Main
Leah Pipes as Katie Clarke
D. W. Moffett as Danny Clarke
Stephanie Niznik as Jo Weller-Clarke
Andrew St. John as Jesse Weller
David Butler as Art
K'Sun Ray as Chase Clarke
Calvin Goldspink as Oliver Banks
Tiffany Mulheron as Emily Banks
Mary Mouser as Mia Weller

Recurring
Atandwa Kani as Tumelo
George Jackos as Colin Banks
Shannon Esra as Lauren
Precious Kofi as Mbali

Brett Cullen and Judith Hoag were originally cast as Danny Clarke and Jo Clarke respectively but the roles were recast in June and July 2007. Jeremy Sheffield was also originally cast in the recurring role of Colin Banks but was replaced by George Jackos when the show received a series order.

Episodes

Reception

U.S. Nielsen ratings

Episode 13 aired against Super Bowl XLII.

Life Is Wild averaged 1.16 million viewers for its sole season.

References

External links

2000s American teen drama television series
2007 American television series debuts
2008 American television series endings
American television series based on British television series
The CW original programming
English-language television shows
Serial drama television series
Television series by All3Media
Television series by CBS Studios
Television shows set in South Africa